Beulah is a village and the county seat of Benzie County, Michigan.  The population was 342 at the 2010 census. It is located in Benzonia Township at the southeast end of Crystal Lake, about one mile (1.6 km) north of Benzonia on U.S. Highway 31 (US 31).

Beulah was founded in 1880 by Charles E. Bailey.  Its name comes from Isaiah 62:4.  The Beulah post office was established in 1892.

Library
Darcy Library of Beulah

Geography

Demographics

2010 census
As of the census of 2010, there were 342 people, 161 households, and 81 families living in the village. The racial makeup of the village was 98.0% White, 0.3% African American, 0.3% Native American, 0.6% from other races, and 0.9% from two or more races. Hispanic or Latino of any race were 2.3% of the population.

There were 161 households, of which 12.4% had children under the age of 18 living with them, 41.0% were married couples living together, 8.7% had a female householder with no husband present, 0.6% had a male householder with no wife present, and 49.7% were non-families. 43.5% of all households were made up of individuals, and 19.3% had someone living alone who was 65 years of age or older. The average household size was 1.81 and the average family size was 2.44.

The median age in the village was 52.7 years. 10.5% of residents were under the age of 18; 8.1% were between the ages of 18 and 24; 19.6% were from 25 to 44; 37.2% were from 45 to 64; and 24.6% were 65 years of age or older. The gender makeup of the village was 51.5% male and 48.5% female.

2000 census
As of the census of 2000, there were 341 people, 190 households, and 102 families living in the village. The racial makeup of the village was 98.35% White, 0.83% Native American, 0.55% from other races, and 0.28% from two or more races. Hispanic or Latino of any race were 1.65% of the population.

There were 190 households, out of which 17.9% had children under the age of 18 living with them, 38.9% were married couples living together, 12.1% had a female householder with no husband present, and 46.3% were non-families. 39.5% of all households were made up of individuals, and 21.6% had someone living alone who was 65 years of age or older.  The average household size was 1.91 and the average family size was 2.49.

In the village, the population was spread out, with 14.3% under the age of 18, 6.6% from 18 to 24, 24.0% from 25 to 44, 28.1% from 45 to 64, and 27.0% who were 65 years of age or older.  The median age was 49 years. For every 100 females, there were 84.3 males.  For every 100 females age 18 and over, there were 82.9 males.

The median income for a household in the village was $31,250, and the median income for a family was $43,750. Males had a median income of $26,458 versus $22,396 for females. The per capita income for the village was $22,389.  About 12.4% of families and 17.2% of the population were below the poverty line, including 14.3% of those under age 18 and 15.5% of those age 65 or over.

Major highways

References

Villages in Benzie County, Michigan
Villages in Michigan
Populated places established in 1880
1880 establishments in Michigan
County seats in Michigan
Traverse City micropolitan area